Benümb / Pig Destroyer is a split album by grindcore bands Benümb and Pig Destroyer.

Track listing 
Benümb performs tracks 1–3. Pig Destroyer performs tracks 4–10.

Pig Destroyer albums
Benümb albums
Split albums
2002 albums